Tlotlo Tsamaase is a Motswana speculative fiction writer and poet whose stories and poems have been nominated for or won numerous awards.  She is currently represented by Naomi Davis of BookEnds Literary Agency.

Her fiction has appeared in Clarkesworld Magazine, The Best of World Science Fiction Volume 1, Futuri uniti d'Africa, Terraform, Strange Horizons, Africanfuturism: An Anthology, and more.

Awards and nominations

|-
! scope="row" | 2011
| Unlettered Skies of the Sublime
| Best Novel
| Bessie Head Short Story Awards
| 
| 
| 
|-
! scope="row" rowspan="2"|2017
| I Will Be Your Grave
| Best Poem
| Rhysling Award
| 
| 
| 
|- 
| Virtual Snapshots
|
| Nommo Award
| 
| 
| 
|-
! scope="row" rowspan="3"|2021
| rowspan="2" |The Silence of the Wilting Skin
| LGBTQ Science Fiction/Fantasy/Horror
| 33rd Lambda Literary Awards
| 
| 
| 
|-
| Best Novella
| rowspan="2"| Nommo Award
| 
|
| 
|-
| Behind Our Irises
| Best Short Story
| 
| Joint winner
|

Selected bibliography

Fiction — short stories
 "Who Will Clean Our Spirits When We Are Gone?", The Dark Magazine
 "The River of Night", The Dark Magazine
 "Eclipse Our Sins", Clarkesworld Magazine
 "Behind Our Irises", in Wole Talabi, editor, Africanfuturism: An Anthology (2020)
 "The River of Night" in Oghenechovwe Donald Ekpeki, editor, The Year's Best African Speculative Fiction (2021)

References

External links

Year of birth missing (living people)
Living people
Botswana short story writers
Botswana women writers